Charles Milnes (born in 1885) was a professional footballer, who played for Bradford Park Avenue, Huddersfield Town Rochdale and Grimsby Town.

References

1885 births
Year of death missing
English footballers
Footballers from Manchester
Association football defenders
English Football League players
Bradford (Park Avenue) A.F.C. players
Huddersfield Town A.F.C. players
Rochdale A.F.C. players
Grimsby Town F.C. players